Wanu Wanuyuq (Quechua wanu dung (guano), -yuq a suffix, "the one with a lot of dung", also spelled Huano Huanoyoj) is a mountain in the Andes of Bolivia which reaches a height of approximately . It is located in the Potosí Department, Nor Chichas Province, Cotagaita Municipality. Wanu Wanuyuq lies east of Achakanayuq.

References 

Mountains of Potosí Department